The Society for Advancement of Chicanos/Hispanics and Native Americans in Science (SACNAS) is a society that aims to further the success of Chicano/Hispanic and Native American students in obtaining advanced degrees, careers, leadership positions, and equality in the STEM field. Founded in 1973, SACNAS has over 20,000 members and 110 chapters on college campuses across the United States and United States held territories.  SACNAS began in junior and high schools through graduate and undergraduate programs with the purpose of mentoring students of minority backgrounds.  The society does not discriminate against any group, and benefits African American, Asian American, and white students, as well as those who are in the social sciences. In the past decade alone, SACNAS has experienced major growth.  The society experienced an increased participation rate of 40% for their annual conferences between 2005 and 2010, while jumping from 32 to 50 chapters on college campuses across the nation between 2007 and 2010. The society's revenue increased as well, moving from $2.3 million to $3.8 million from 2007 to 2010, a total growth of 65%. SACNAS is the largest multicultural STEM diversity organization in the US.

Strategy
SACNAS released a strategic plan in April 2011, titled Vision 2020, which outlines the society's goals for the next decade, the vision for SACNAS in 2020, and how the board of SACNAS plans to achieve both.  SACNAS plans to continue to uphold its mission statement and values by expanding the society's membership base, heighten the support and resources offered to students and professionals, further engage in policy and advocacy for the advancement of Chicanos/Hispanics and Native Americans in STEM fields, foster partnerships and collaborations with other organizations and companies (resulting in scholarships and internships for members), and build organizational capacity and information technology. SACNAS has been noted for using social media and online networking as a way to diversify the STEM fields and counteract the geographic isolation that many minority groups aiming to succeed in science face. SACNAS is also dedicated to increasing the amount of graduate and post-graduate funding available for Chicanos/Hispanics and Native Americans, which is key to increasing their numbers in STEM fields.

Annual Programs

SACNAS holds several different yearly programs that aim to increase Chicano/Hispanic and Native American participation and success in science.  As part of their strategy to support Chicano/Hispanic and Native American students and professionals, SACNAS holds an annual conference, The National Diversity in STEM Conference, which consists of workshops, scientific presentations (including posters and oral presentations), motivational speakers, and networking events.  SACNAS even provides funding for lodging at and travel to and from the annual conference in the form of scholarships. From 2005 to 2010, the student researcher participation increased from 543 to 883 people. The 2019 SACNAS National Conference was held in Honolulu, HI.

Along with the National Diversity in STEM Conference, SACNAS holds two leadership conferences a year with the goal of developing leadership skills and preparing minority groups to take leadership positions in STEM fields at all levels.  SACNAS has 115 professional and student chapters across the nation, which provide a local community and support, as well as opportunities in science, leadership, and development for members.  Chapters are encouraged to host two SACNAS Regional Meetings each spring.  Regional meetings are an opportunity for surrounding chapters, members, high schools, and professionals to become informed on upcoming SACNAS events and opportunities, while also providing the opportunity for chapters to network and students to share the research in a scientific community. Within the larger SACNAS community, the society has also created an online Native American community, which provides learning, teaching, networking, and mentoring resources for Native American students.

Board of Directors
The SACNAS Board of Directors provides governance and leadership, and supports fundraising efforts of the organization. The board is composed of ten members in total: four officers, seven members at large, two student members, and one board liaison. Like the society as a whole, the board of directors represents a broad spectrum of backgrounds and careers in STEM. Former President (2016-2018) Lino Gonzalez is a senior scientist at 23andMe. Current President (and former Secretary) Sonia Zárate is the Program Officer for Undergraduate and Graduate Science Education at Howard Hughes Medical Institute.  Treasurer Patricia Silveyra and Secretary Corey Garza are both faculty at universities. Maria Elena Zavala served as the Society's first Chicana president between 2001 and 2002.

Past Presidents

Past Board Members

Awards 

SACNAS gives various awards at the National Diversity in STEM annual meeting. These include the Distinguished Scientist Award and the Distinguished Mentor Award. Past recipients of the Distinguished Scientist Award include: Fred Begay, Richard A. Tapia, Carlos Castillo-Chavez, Donna Nelson, Eloy Rodriguez, Jorge Gardea-Torresdey, Enrique Lavernia, Margaret Werner-Washburne, Elma Gonzalez, Miguel José Yacamán, Adriana Briscoe, and Renato Aguilera. SACNAS chapters can also win awards for excellence.

SACNAS has also earned external awards: in 2001, SACNAS received the Public Service Award from the National Science Board, and in 2004 received the Presidential Award for Excellence in Science, Mathematics, and Engineering Mentoring (PAESMEM). Marigold Linton, one of the founding members and past Presidents, also received the PAESMEM award individually in 2011.

References

External links
 

1973 establishments in the United States
Chicano
Hispanic and Latino American organizations
Mexican-American organizations
Native American organizations
Organizations established in 1973
Non-profit organizations based in California
Scientific societies based in the United States